Andrei Grankin (born 8 January 1987) is a Russian professional ice hockey player who currently under contract with HC Amur Khabarovsk of the Kontinental Hockey League (KHL).

Grankin played five games in the Russian Superleague during the 2006–07 season.

References

External links

1987 births
Living people
Russian ice hockey forwards
Ice hockey people from Moscow